The SC Discovery is a Ukrainian single-place paraglider that was designed and produced by SC Paragliding of Kharkiv. It is now out of production.

Design and development
The Discovery was designed as an intermediate glider, plus a tandem version for flight training, referred to as the Discovery Bi, indicating "bi-place" or two seater.

The models are each named for their wing area in square metres.

Reviewer Noel Bertrand noted the Discovery series in a 2003 review for its low price, being one of the few gliders available in that time period under €1,000.

Variants
Discovery 23
Extra small-sized model for lighter pilots.
Discovery 25
Small-sized model for lighter pilots.
Discovery 28
Mid-sized model for medium-weight pilots.
Discovery 31
Large-sized model for heavier pilots.
Discovery 34
Extra large-sized model for heavier pilots.
Discovery 39 Bi
Small-sized two-place model for lighter crews.
Discovery 42 Bi
Large-sized two-place model for heavier crews.

Specifications (Discovery 25)

See also
SC Scorpion

References

Discovery
Paragliders